The men's nine-ball doubles tournament at the 2002 Asian Games in Busan took place from 6 October to 7 October at Dongju College Gymnasium.

16 teams entered for the tournament. The teams were seeded based on their final ranking at the same event at the 1998 Asian Games in Bangkok.

Top seed Philippines (Francisco Bustamante and Antonio Lining) won the gold after beating South Korean team of Jeong Young-hwa and Kim Won-suk in the final 11 to 9. Kuwait (Khaled Al-Mutairi and Aref Al-Awadhi) won the bronze medal after an 11–6 win against Japan in bronze medal match.

Schedule
All times are Korea Standard Time (UTC+09:00)

Results

References 
2002 Asian Games Official Report, Page 291

External links 
 Official Website

Cue sports at the 2002 Asian Games